Oliver James Fisher (born 13 September 1988) is an English professional golfer who plays on the European Tour. He also played in the inaugural LIV Golf Invitational Series.

Early years and amateur career
Fisher was born in Chingford, London. He was a winner of the Faldo Series, Nick Faldo's development programme for young golfers, in 2003, 2004 and 2005, and as such was regarded as one of the best prospects of his generation.
In 2004, he was part of the English team winning the European Boys' Team Championship and a member of Europe's winning 2004 Junior Ryder Cup team against United States in Ohio. In 2005 he became the youngest player to take part in the Walker Cup.

In late 2006, while still an amateur, Fisher entered the European Tour's qualifying school. He finished fifth to become the youngest Briton to win a tour card and immediately turned professional.

Professional career
He made the cut at his first five European Tour events and ended the season just outside the top 100 on the 2007 Order of Merit to retain his card for 2008. A solid 2008 season which included a runner-up finish at the MAPFRE Open de Andalucía by Valle Romano, where he lost out in a playoff with Thomas Levet, saw him finish in 51st place on the Order of Merit.

Fisher was coached from 9 years old until January 2009 by Chris Jenkins.

The 2009 season proved a struggle for Fisher as he finished 125th on the Race To Dubai standings and therefore lost his European Tour Card, and failed to gain it back at qualifying school. Nevertheless, Fisher received a number of starts and sponsors invites in 2010, and a run of 4 consecutive top ten finishes in the early part of the season gave Fisher the momentum to successfully re-establish himself and regain full playing rights for the 2011 season.

Fisher endured an horrific start to the 2011 season missing 20 of his first 21 cuts before back-to-back made cuts in Sweden at the Nordea Masters and the Irish Open. In his very next tournament on the European Tour, Fisher won his maiden tour title at the Czech Open in August. He entered the final round tied for the lead and shot a closing 69 to win by two strokes from Mikael Lundberg. Fisher had started the tournament way down at 224th on the Race to Dubai and was in danger of losing his card, but the victory earned him a two-year tour exemption.

At the end of 2012, Fisher entered the PGA Tour Qualifying School and reached the final stage. However, he missed qualifying by just one stroke over six rounds. This was the last time that the Qualifying School provided a chance for players to qualify for the main PGA Tour, rather than the Web.com Tour. He remained on the European Tour for 2013.

In 2018, Fisher shot the first-ever round of 59 on the European Tour in the second round of the Portugal Masters.

Amateur wins
2004 McGregor Trophy
2006 St Andrews Links Trophy

Professional wins (1)

European Tour wins (1)

European Tour playoff record (0–2)

Results in major championships

CUT = missed the half-way cut
"T" = tied

Team appearances
Amateur
 European Boys' Team Championship (representing England): 2004 (winners)
 Junior Ryder Cup (representing Europe): 2004 (winners)
European Amateur Team Championship (representing England): 2005 (winners)
Walker Cup (representing Great Britain & Ireland): 2005
European Youths' Team Championship (representing England): 2006
Eisenhower Trophy (representing England): 2006
St Andrews Trophy (representing Great Britain & Ireland): 2006 (winners)
Bonallack Trophy (representing Europe): 2006 (winners)

See also
2006 European Tour Qualifying School graduates
Lowest rounds of golf

References

External links

English male golfers
European Tour golfers
LIV Golf players
People from Chingford
People from Chigwell
1988 births
Living people